Salvador Miranda (born 13 September 1949) is a Nicaraguan boxer. He competed in the men's flyweight event at the 1972 Summer Olympics. At the 1972 Summer Olympics, he lost to Arturo Delgado of Mexico.

References

1949 births
Living people
Nicaraguan male boxers
Olympic boxers of Nicaragua
Boxers at the 1972 Summer Olympics
Place of birth missing (living people)
Flyweight boxers